Efendi bin Abdul Malek (born 5 September 1978 in Negeri Sembilan) is a Malaysian former footballer.

He is most associated with his hometown team, Negeri Sembilan FA, whom he played for 9 years in 2 spells. His other clubs include Melaka TMFC, Perlis FA, Sarawak FA, MP Muar FC and ATM FA. He last professional club was Betaria FC, whom he played for in the 2013 Malaysia Premier League.

He also has played with the Malaysia national football team.

References

External links
 
 

1978 births
Living people
Malaysian footballers
Malaysia international footballers
Perlis FA players
Negeri Sembilan FA players
Sarawak FA players
People from Negeri Sembilan

Association football forwards